Strangea stenocarpoides is a shrub of the family Proteaceae native to Western Australia.

References

Flora of Western Australia
stenocarpoides
Plants described in 1870
Taxa named by George Bentham